Raed Chabab Gharb d'Oran, or simply RCG Oran, is an Algerian professional soccer club based in Oran, founded in 1947. The club colours are black and red.

History
The club was founded in 1947 in Cité Petit in Oran by European settlers under the name of Racing Club de Cité Petit. With the independence of the country in 1962 and the departure of the settlers, the club was renamed a year later in 1963 Racing Club d'Oran (RC Oran) until 1972 when he took the name of the Raed Chabab Ghabat Ouahran following its integration with ONTF (Office des Forets). In 1977 and as part of the sports reform, the club is taken over by the National Society of Steel (SNS) is takes the name of SNS Oran and ECTT Oran until the end of the 80s and the end of the sports reform where the club takes the name of Raed Chabab Gharb d'Oran.

The club has played in division 1 during the 1976-77 season.

Achievements
Algerian Ligue 2
 Champion: 1976

Stadium
The team plays in the Lahouari Benahmed Stadium in Choupot, Oran which holds 10,000 people.

Equipment
 2014–15  Baeko

External links
Team profile – goalzz.com

Football clubs in Algeria
RCG Oran
Association football clubs established in 1947
Sports clubs in Algeria
1947 establishments in Algeria